This is a list of presidents of the United States who owned slaves. Slavery was legal in the United States from its beginning as a nation, having been practiced in North America from early colonial days. The Thirteenth Amendment to the United States Constitution formally abolished slavery in 1865, immediately after the end of the American Civil War. 

Twelve U.S. presidents owned slaves at some point in their lives; of these, eight owned slaves while in office. Ten of the first twelve American presidents were slave owners, the only exceptions being John Adams and his son John Quincy Adams, neither of whom approved of slavery. George Washington was the first president who owned slaves, including while he was president. Zachary Taylor was the last who owned slaves during his presidency, and Ulysses S. Grant was the last president to have owned a slave at some point in his life. Of those presidents who were slaveholders, Thomas Jefferson owned the most, with 600+ slaves, followed closely by George Washington.

Woodrow Wilson was the last president born into a household with slave labor, though the Civil War concluded during his childhood.

Presidents who owned slaves

See also

Abolitionism in the United States
District of Columbia Compensated Emancipation Act (1862), which ended slavery in Washington, D.C.
John Quincy Adams and abolitionism
List of slave owners
List of vice presidents of the United States who owned slaves
Slavery in the District of Columbia
Treatment of slaves in the United States

Notes

References

 

Slaves
presidents